Sergio Torres Guardeño (born 2 March 1984 in Córdoba, Andalusia) is a Spanish footballer who plays as a midfielder.

Club career
During his senior career, all but spent in the lower leagues, Torres represented Atlético Madrid B – he played three years with the Colchoneros reserves, in Segunda División B – Ciudad de Murcia, CD Tenerife, Racing Club Portuense, Zamora CF, CF Badalona, Caravaca CF, Burgos CF, Lucena CF, CD Ciudad de Lucena (two spells), Martos CD and Atlético Mancha Real.

At the professional level, Torres' input consisted of 34 matches (no goals) in Segunda División, during two seasons. He made his debut in the competition on 4 September 2005 whilst at the service of Ciudad de Murcia, starting in a 1–0 away win against Atlético Malagueño.

HonoursSpain U16UEFA European Under-16 Championship: 2001Spain U19UEFA European Under-19 Championship: 2002Spain U23'
Mediterranean Games: 2005

References

External links

1984 births
Living people
Footballers from Córdoba, Spain
Spanish footballers
Association football midfielders
Segunda División players
Segunda División B players
Tercera División players
Atlético Madrid B players
Atlético Madrid footballers
Ciudad de Murcia footballers
CD Tenerife players
Zamora CF footballers
CF Badalona players
Caravaca CF players
Burgos CF footballers
Lucena CF players
Martos CD footballers
Spain youth international footballers
Spain under-23 international footballers
Competitors at the 2005 Mediterranean Games
Mediterranean Games medalists in football
Mediterranean Games gold medalists for Spain